Glenelg is a civil parish in Northumberland County, New Brunswick, Canada.

For governance purposes it is divided between the city of Miramichi, the village of Nouvelle-Arcadie, and the Greater Miramichi rural district. Miramichi and the rural district are members of the Greater Miramichi Regional Service Commission, while Nouvelle-Arcadie belongs to the Kent RSC.

Prior to the 2023 governance reform, the parish was divided between Miramichi and the local service districts of Black River-Hardwicke, St. Margarets, and the parish of Glenelg.

Origin of name
The parish was named in honour of Charles Grant, one of the Lords Commissioners of the Treasury when the parish was erected. Grant was entitled as a Lord Commissioner to be addressed as Lord, and chose to be titled Baron Glenelg, of Glenelg in the County of Inverness when raised to the peerage in 1835.

History
Glenelg was erected in 1814 from Newcastle Parish. The southwestern line was further east, along the prolongation of a line about 300 metres west of Harper Road in Miramichi. Glenelg contained almost all of Hardwicke Parish until 1852 and the Rosaireville area of Rogersville Parish until 1900.

Boundaries
Glenelg Parish is bounded:

 on the north, beginning at a point about 375 metres east of Sutton Road and about 75 metres north of Carding Mill Brook, then running north 68º east to the westernmost corner of a grant to Henry Coils, about 300 metres east of the junction of Searle Road and North Napan Road and about 400 metres north of the junction of Hannah Hill Road and Weldfield Collette Road, then down the Napan River to its mouth, then through Napan Bay, Miramichi River, and Miramichi Inner Bay;
 on the east by a line beginning in Bay du Vin, then running up the Big Black River to the mouth of Little Black River, then up Little Black River to the northern point of a grant to Fred A. Fowlie, about 125 metres upstream of the Little Branch Road bridge, then running southeasterly along the northeastern line of the Fowlie grant and its prolongation to the Kent County line;
 on the south, beginning on the county line at a point about 3.1 kilometres northeasterly of Hells Gate Lake, then running northwesterly along the county line to a point about 2.6 kilometres slightly south of east of the junction of Richard-Village Road and Route 440, then northeasterly along the prolongation of the eastern line of grants in the Richard Settlement along Route 440 to the Bay du Vin River, then up Bay du Vin River to the northern line of a grant to John Townley at the mouth of Big Hovel Brook, then westerly along the Townley grant to the western parish line;
 on the west by a line beginning at the Townley grant on the prolongation of the southwestern line of a grant to William Brown Sr. in Chatham Parish, which ends at the Miramichi River in a cove northeasterly of the junction of Rasche Street and St. Patrick's Drive, then running northwesterly along the prolongation to the starting point.

Evolution of boundaries
The original western line of Glenelg was the southeasterly prolongation of the southwestern line of Chatham Parish, which ran about 300 metres west of Harper Road along the southwestern line of a grant to William McCallum, to what is now the Kent County line; the northwestern line ran up the Napan River to meet the southwestern line.

In 1850 the southwestern and northwestern lines were changed to their modern positions. This exchanged several small pieces of territory along the Napan River with Chatham and added a strip of Nelson Parish along the southwestern line, which included part of what's now the Rosairville area.

In 1852 the eastern part of Glenelg was erected as Hardwicke Parish.

In 1900 an area south of the Bay du Vin River was transferred to Rogersville Parish, taking Rosaireville and the Richard Settlement east of it.

Communities
Communities at least partly within the parish. bold indicates an incorporated municipality

 Bay du Vin Mills
 Black River
 Black River Bridge
  Centre Napan
 Fowlies Mill
  Glenwood
 Little Branch
  Miramichi
  Napan Bay
 Point aux Carr
  Redmondville
  St. Margarets
  Upper Napan
 Victoria
 Weldfield
 Wine River

Bodies of water
Bodies of water at least partly in the parish.

 Bay du Vin River
  Black River
 Little Black River
 Napan River
 Hortons Creek
 Sturgeon Creek
 Taylor Creek
 Dry Lake
 Hells Gate Lake
 Macs Lake
 Rosaireville Lake
 Sands Lake
  Miramichi Inner Bay

Other notable places
Parks, historic sites, and other noteworthy places at least partly in the parish.
 Black River Protected Natural Area
 CFB St. Margarets
 Goodfellow Brook Protected Natural Area
 Hells Gate Hardwoods Protected Natural Area

Demographics
Parish population total does not include portion within  Miramichi

Population
Population trend

Language
Mother tongue (2016)

See also
List of parishes in New Brunswick

Notes

References

Parishes of Northumberland County, New Brunswick
Local service districts of Northumberland County, New Brunswick